William Robert Orthwein (October 16, 1881 – October 2, 1955) was an American sportsman, attorney, business executive and political activist.

Early life
William Robert Orthwein was born on October 16, 1881. His father, William D. Orthwein, was a German-born grain merchant.

Orthwein graduated from Yale University. While at Yale in November 1902, he was arrested on charges of assaulting a ticket seller for a Yale-Harvard football game; one month later, he was fined for it.

Orthwein competed in the 1904 Summer Olympics as a freestyle and backstroke swimmer and water polo player. He won a bronze medal as a member of American 4x50-yard freestyle relay team and as a member of the Missouri Athletic Club water polo team. He also finished fourth in the 100-yard backstroke.

Orthwein received a law degree from the School of Law at Washington University in St. Louis.

Career
Orthwein was an attorney. He served as the vice president and general counsel of the Kinloch Telephone Company in 1920. In that capacity, he refused to sell the business to the Bell Telephone Company.

During World War II, he served as a supply commissioner for the City of St. Louis. Meanwhile, Orthwein joined the Republican Party. In 1948, he ran unsuccessful for the nomination of lieutenant-governor.

Personal life
Orthwein married Nina Kent Baldwin. They had a son, William R. Orthwein, Jr.

Death
Orthwein died on October 2, 1955 at the Barnes Hospital in St. Louis, Missouri.

References

See also
 List of athletes with Olympic medals in different disciplines
 List of Olympic medalists in swimming (men)

1881 births
1955 deaths
Lawyers from St. Louis
Sportspeople from St. Louis
Washington University School of Law alumni
Missouri Republicans
American male backstroke swimmers
American male freestyle swimmers
American male water polo players
Olympic bronze medalists for the United States in swimming
Olympic medalists in water polo
Olympic water polo players of the United States
Swimmers at the 1904 Summer Olympics
Water polo players at the 1904 Summer Olympics
Yale Bulldogs men's swimmers
20th-century American lawyers
American business executives
American people of German descent
Medalists at the 1904 Summer Olympics
Orthwein business family